The following lists the number one singles on the Australian Singles Chart, along with other substantial hits, during the 1980s. The source for this decade is the Kent Music Report (retitled as Australian Music Report in 1987), and the ARIA Charts.

1980s Australian charts

Two sets of charts ran in Australia in the late 1980s. The Kent Music Report began publication in 1974 as Australia's official national charts. From mid-1983, the Australian Recording Industry Association (or ARIA) licensed the Kent Music Report (which was renamed the 'Australian Music Report' in 1987). ARIA commenced compiling its own charts in-house from the week ending 26 June 1988 (a Sunday). These charts ran concurrent to what was by then known as the Australian Music Report. The Australian Music Report charts ceased commercial publishing in 1999.

Both the Kent Music Report / Australian Music Report chart data (1980–1989) and the ARIA chart data (starting from their commencement in mid-1983) are listed below. The Kent Music Report / Australian Music Report chart data is taken from the "Australian Chart Book 1970–92", published by David Kent, while the ARIA chart date is take from australia-charts.com.

The dates given for the Kent Music Report / Australian Music Report are Mondays.

Kent/Australian Music Report

1980 (Kent Music Report)

Other hits
Songs peaking at number two included "Dreaming My Dreams with You" by Colleen Hewett, "Another Brick in the Wall (Part 2)" by Pink Floyd, "Brass in Pocket" by The Pretenders, "Coming Up" by Paul McCartney, "You've Lost That Lovin' Feelin'" by Long John Baldry and Kathi McDonald, "What I Like About You" by The Romantics, "Xanadu" by Olivia Newton-John and Electric Light Orchestra, "Babooshka" by Kate Bush, and "Master Blaster (Jammin')" by Stevie Wonder.

Other hits (with their peak positions noted) were "Space Invaders" (3) by Player One, "Ashes to Ashes" (3) by David Bowie, "Do That to Me One More Time" (3) by Captain & Tennille, "Fame" (3) by Irene Cara, "He's My Number One" (4) by Christie Allen, "Call Me" (4) and "The Tide Is High" (4) by Blondie, "Blame It on the Boogie" (4) by The Jacksons, and "Shandi" (5) by KISS.

Hits by Australasian artists included "Magic" by Olivia Newton-John, "People" by Mi-Sex, "No Secrets" by The Angels, "You Shook Me All Night Long" by AC/DC and "Can't Help Myself" and "We Can Get Together" by Flowers.

1981 (Kent Music Report)

Other hits
Songs peaking at number two included "Stop the Cavalry" and "Louise (We Get It Right)" by Jona Lewie, "Angel of the Morning" by Juice Newton, "Who Can It Be Now?" by Men at Work, "Every Little Thing She Does Is Magic" by The Police, and "Wired for Sound" by Cliff Richard.

"Turn Me Loose" by Loverboy, "Girls Can Get It" by Dr. Hook, "Keep On Loving You" by REO Speedwagon, "Gotta Pull Myself Together" by The Nolans and "In the Air Tonight" by Phil Collins all peaked at number 3. Other major hits (with their peak positions) were "Jesse" by Carly Simon (4), "Kids in America" by Kim Wilde (5) and "Precious to Me" by Phil Seymour (6).

Hits by Australasian artists included "If I Were a Carpenter" by Swanee, "Bad Habits" by Billy Field, "Boys in Town" by Divinyls and "State of the Heart" by Mondo Rock.

1982 (Kent Music Report)

Other hits
Songs peaking at number two included "Our Lips Are Sealed" by The Go-Go's, "Theme from The Greatest American Hero (Believe It or Not)" by Joey Scarbury, "Ebony and Ivory" by Paul McCartney and Stevie Wonder, "Key Largo" by Bertie Higgins, "Six Months in a Leaky Boat" by Split Enz, "If You Want My Love" by Cheap Trick, and "Shy Boy" by Bananarama.

Other hits (with peak positions shown) included "Waiting for a Girl Like You" (3) by Foreigner, "Young Turks" (3) by Rod Stewart, "Hard to Say I'm Sorry" (4) by Chicago, "You Should Hear How She Talks About You" (4) by Melissa Manchester, "Da Da Da" (4) by Trio, "Poison Arrow" (4) by ABC, "Homosapien" (4) by Pete Shelley, "Hurts So Good" (5) by John "Cougar" Mellencamp, "Hungry Like the Wolf" (5) by Duran Duran and "Cambodia" (7) by Kim Wilde.

Hits by Australasian artists included "Forever Now" by Cold Chisel, "Body and Soul" by Jo Kennedy, "Solid Rock" by Goanna, "Great Southern Land" by Icehouse, "Dirty Creature" by Split Enz, "Down on the Border" by Little River Band and "Lady, What's Your Name" by Swanee.

1983 (Kent Music Report/ARIA Charts)

Other hits
Songs peaking at number two included "Heartbreaker" by Dionne Warwick, "Twisting by the Pool" (EP) by Dire Straits, "Let's Dance" by David Bowie, "1999" by Prince, "Beat It" by Michael Jackson, "Every Breath You Take" by The Police, "Electric Avenue" by Eddy Grant, "Maniac" by Michael Sembello, "Rain" by Dragon, "Bop Girl" by Pat Wilson, and "Red Red Wine" by UB40.

Other major hits (with peak positions noted) included "Save Your Love" (3) by Renee and Renato, "Give It Up" (3) by KC and the Sunshine Band, "I'm Still Standing" (3) by Elton John, "You Can't Hurry Love" (3) by Phil Collins, "I.O.U." (3) by Freeez, "I Eat Cannibals" (4) by Toto Coelo, "Young Guns" (4) by Wham!, "The Safety Dance" (5) by Men Without Hats, "Africa" (5) by Toto, and "Drop the Pilot" (6) by Joan Armatrading.

Hits by Australasian artists also included "Send Me an Angel" by Real Life, "Fraction Too Much Friction" by Tim Finn, "Shoop Shoop Diddy Wop Cumma Cumma Wang Dang" by Monte Video and the Cassettes, "Overkill" and "Dr. Heckyll & Mr. Jive" by Men at Work, and "Power and the Passion" by Midnight Oil.

1984 (Kent Music Report/ARIA Charts)

Other hits
The year's best charting single was Bruce Springsteen's "Dancing in the Dark". Although it only reached number 5 on the singles chart, it remained on the charts for 40 weeks.

Songs peaking at number two included "Come Said the Boy" by Mondo Rock, "Radio Ga Ga" by Queen, "Jump" by Van Halen, "Heaven (Must Be There)" by Eurogliders, "Ghostbusters" by Ray Parker Jr., "The War Song" by Culture Club, and "Caribbean Queen (No More Love on the Run)" by Billy Ocean.

Other major hits (with peak position noted) included "Calling Your Name" (3) by Marilyn, "Against All Odds (Take a Look at Me Now)" (3) by Phil Collins, "I Can Dream About You" (3) by Dan Hartman, "Hold Me Now" (3) by Thompson Twins, "Thriller" (4) by Michael Jackson, "Pride (In the Name of Love)" (4) by U2, "Sad Songs (Say So Much)" (4) by Elton John, and "Relax" (5) and "Two Tribes" (4) by Frankie Goes to Hollywood.

Hits by Australasian artists also included "Listening" and "A Beat for You" both by Pseudo Echo, "I Send a Message" and "Burn for You" by INXS, "Twist of Fate" by Olivia Newton-John, "Soul Kind of Feeling" by Dynamic Hepnotics and "Catch Me I'm Falling" by Real Life.

1985 (Kent Music Report/ARIA Charts)

Other hits
Songs peaking at number two included "Born in the U.S.A." by Bruce Springsteen, "Ti Amo" by Laura Branigan, "Barbados" by Models, "The Heat Is On" by Glenn Frey, "One More Night" by Phil Collins, "Everybody Wants to Rule the World" by Tears for Fears, "Can't Fight This Feeling" by REO Speedwagon, "Live It Up" by Mental As Anything, and "What You Need" by INXS.

Other major hits (with peak positions noted) included "You Spin Me Round (Like a Record)" (3) by Dead or Alive, "Part-Time Lover" (3) by Stevie Wonder, "Last Christmas" (3) by Wham!, "Money for Nothing" (4) by Dire Straits, "Neutron Dance" (4) by Pointer Sisters, and "Walking on Sunshine" (4) by Katrina and the Waves.

Hits by Australasian artists also included "I'd Die to Be with You Tonight" by Jimmy Barnes, "50 Years" by Uncanny X-Men, "Too Young for Promises" by Koo De Tah, "Man Overboard" by Do-Ré-Mi, "Don’t Go" by Pseudo Echo, "We Will Together" by Eurogliders, and "Pleasure and Pain" by Divinyls.

1986 (Kent Music Report/ARIA Charts)

Other hits
Songs peaking at number two included "Concrete and Clay" by Martin Plaza, "How Will I Know" by Whitney Houston, "Kiss" by Prince and The Revolution, "Stimulation" by Wa Wa Nee, "The Edge of Heaven" by Wham!, "Dancing on the Ceiling" by Lionel Richie, "Take My Breath Away" by Berlin, "Stuck with You" by Huey Lewis and the News, "You Can Call Me Al" by Paul Simon, "Don't Leave Me This Way" by The Communards, and "The Lady in Red" by Chris de Burgh.

Other major hits included "Manic Monday" (3) by The Bangles, "A Matter of Trust" (3) by Billy Joel, "True Colors" (3) by Cyndi Lauper, "Hit That Perfect Beat" (3) by Bronski Beat, "I'm Your Man" (3) by Wham!, "Invisible Touch" (3) by Genesis, "I Wanna Be a Cowboy" (4) by Boys Don't Cry, and "West End Girls" (5) by Pet Shop Boys.

Hits by Australasian artists also included "The Dead Heart" by Midnight Oil, "Who Made Who" by AC/DC, "Great Wall" by Boom Crash Opera, "I Could Make You Love Me" by Wa Wa Nee, "Love an Adventure" by Pseudo Echo, and "Do You Wanna Be?" by I'm Talking.

1987 (Australian Music Report/ARIA Charts)

Other hits
Songs peaking at number two included "Good Times" by Jimmy Barnes and INXS, "The Final Countdown" by Europe, "I Want Your Sex" by George Michael, and "Suddenly" by Angry Anderson.

Other major hits (with peak positions noted) included "Old Time Rock and Roll" (3) by Bob Seger and the Silver Bullet Band, "Nothing's Gonna Stop Us Now" (3) by Starship, "Livin' on a Prayer" (3) by Bon Jovi, "Star Trekkin'" (3) by The Firm, "Bad" (4) by Michael Jackson, "What's My Scene?" (3) by Hoodoo Gurus, "Pressure Down" (4) by John Farnham, "Crazy" (4) by Icehouse and "Beds Are Burning" (6) by Midnight Oil.

1988 (Australian Music Report/ARIA Charts)

Other hits
Songs peaking at number two included "Heaven Is a Place on Earth" by Belinda Carlisle, "Stutter Rap (No Sleep Til Bedtime)" by Morris Minor and the Majors, "Better Be Home Soon" by Crowded House, "Doctorin' the Tardis" by The Timelords, The Only Way Is Up by Yazz, and "If I Could" by 1927.

1989 (Australian Music Report)

Other hits
Songs peaking at number two included "Especially for You" by Kylie Minogue and Jason Donovan, "Bedroom Eyes" by Kate Ceberano, "Batdance" by Prince, "I'll Be Loving You (Forever)" by New Kids on the Block, and "All I Want Is You" by U2.

ARIA Charts
ARIA licensed the top 50 portion of the Kent Music Report (re-branded the Australian Music Report in 1987) chart between June 1983 and early June 1988. ARIA conducted its own chart survey, for the first time, on 6 June 1988, producing a top 50 chart as a test-run.  The following week's survey, 13 June 1988, became the first ARIA-produced chart published, although it was dated week-ending 26 June 1988 on the printed top 50 chart available in record stores, in keeping with the Australian Music Report's method of dating their charts.  The ARIA-produced chart ran concurrently with the Australian Music Report, until the latter ceased publication in 1999. The dates given for ARIA Charts below are Mondays, reflecting the date the chart survey was conducted.

1988 (ARIA Charts)

Other hits
Bill Medley and Jennifer Warnes' hit "(I've Had) The Time of My Life" was the best-charting single of the year according to ARIA (whereas the Australian Music Report lists this as the 2nd best-charting single of the year.)

Songs peaking at number two songs included "Better Be Home Soon" by Crowded House, "Doctorin' the Tardis" by The Timelords, "All Fired Up" by Pat Benatar, "The Only Way Is Up" by Yazz and the Plastic Population, and "A Groovy Kind of Love" by Phil Collins.

Other major hits (with peak positions noted) included "Don't Be Cruel" (4) by Cheap Trick, "Love in the First Degree" (5) and "I Want You Back" (3) by Bananarama, "When Will I Be Famous?" (10) and "I Owe You Nothing" (6) by Bros, "I Want Your Love" (7) by Transvision Vamp and "Fat" (12) by "Weird Al Yankovic".

Hits by Australasian artists (with peak positions noted) also included "When a Man Loves a Woman" (3) by Jimmy Barnes, "Nothing Can Divide Us" (3) by Jason Donovan, "That's When I Think of You" (6) and "If I Could" (4) by 1927, "Love Is a Bridge" (11) by Little River Band, "So Excellent"/"I Go, I Go" (8) by Kylie Mole, and "I Still Love You (Je Ne Sais Pas Pourquoi)" (11) by Kylie Minogue.

1989 (ARIA Charts)

Other hits
The biggest chart hit, Madonna's "Like a Prayer", was ranked the 2nd best-charting single of the year by the Australian Music Report.

Songs peaking at number two included "Especially for You" by Kylie Minogue and Jason Donovan, "Teardrops" by Womack & Womack, "Tucker's Daughter" by Ian Moss, "Bedroom Eyes" by Kate Ceberano, "Batdance" by Prince, "All I Want Is You" by U2, and "We Didn't Start the Fire" by Billy Joel.

Other major hits (with peak positions noted) included "Baby I Don't Care" (3) by Transvision Vamp, "Poison" (3) by Alice Cooper, "Stop!" (4) by Sam Brown, "Talk It Over" (4) by Grayson Hugh, "Dressed for Success" (3) by Roxette, "You Got It" (3) by Roy Orbison, "The Best" (4) by Tina Turner, and "I Don't Want a Lover" (4) by Texas.

Hits by Australasian artists also included "Ring My Bell" (5) by Collette, "She Has to Be Loved" (5) by Jenny Morris, "Rock and Roll Music" (5) by Mental As Anything, "One Summer" (8) by Daryl Braithwaite, "Say Goodbye" (6) by Indecent Obsession, "Chained to the Wheel" (9) by The Black Sorrows, and "Hand on Your Heart" (4), "Wouldn't Change a Thing" (6), "Never Too Late" (14) all by Kylie Minogue.

See also
Music of Australia
List of UK Singles Chart number ones of the 1980s
List of Billboard number-one singles

References
David Kent's Australian Chart Book: based on the Kent Music Report
Australian Record Industry Association (ARIA) official site
OzNet Music Chart
australian-charts.com
Number One Songs

Specific

1980s
Number-one singles
Australia Singles